Cyclograpsus granulosus, the purple mottled shore crab or smooth shore crab, is an Australasian crab species.

Description
The carapace's frontal regions are granulate, and its lateral margins are convex.

Ecology
C. granulosus is most commonly found on stony or boulder beaches. The species occupies both the supralittoral fringe (a region above the level washed by all tides, but subject to flying spray) and the midlittoral region (above the level not uncovered by all tides). However, the species typically occupies the upper midlittoral region. C. granulosus sometimes scrapes out shallow depressions beneath stones, and is most commonly found under boulders.

References 

Grapsoidea
Crustaceans of Australia
Crustaceans described in 1853
Taxa named by Henri Milne-Edwards